Max Herbrechter (born March 12, 1958) is a German actor living in Hamburg.

Filmography (selection) 

 1983: Diese Drombuschs
 1989: Rote Erde
 1991: Tatort: Bis zum Hals im Dreck
 1992: Tatort: Der Mörder und der Prinz
 1993: Freunde fürs Leben
 1993: 
 1994: Diese Drombuschs
 1994: Die Männer vom K3
 1995: Großstadtrevier (television series, one part)
 1995: Tatort: Herz As
 1997: Zwei Engel mit vier Fäusten
 1997: Polizeiruf 110: Gänseblümchen (TV series)
 1996: Adelheid und ihre Mörder (television series, part Liebe, Tod und Leidenschaft)
 1997–1999:  (television series)
 1998: Geschichten aus dem Leben (TV series)
 1998: Lisa Falk – Eine Frau für alle Fälle (television series)
 1999: 
 1999–2003: Die Pfefferkörner
 2000: Gran Paradiso
 2000: Tatort: Quartett in Leipzig
 2001: Tatort: Bienzle und der Todesschrei
 2001: Ritas Welt (television series, part Frikadellenkrieg)
 2002: Aus lauter Liebe zu Dir
 2002, 2007: Alarm für Cobra 11 – Die Autobahnpolizei (television series, two parts)
 2003: Wilsberg – Wilsberg und der stumme Zeuge
 2003: Lottoschein ins Glück
 2003: Ein starkes Team: Kollege Mörder (television movie)
 2004: Wie erziehe ich meine Eltern?
 2005–2007: Doppelter Einsatz
 2006: Tatort: Das verlorene Kind
 2006: Tatort: Pauline
 2007: Der Dicke (television series, one part)
 2007–2012: Der Staatsanwalt (television series, three parts)
 2007: 
 2008, 2012: Notruf Hafenkante (television series, parts Das verlassene Kind and Der Prozess)
 2008: Im Tal der wilden Rosen – Zerrissene Herzen
 2008: Der Winzerkönig
 2008: Was wenn der Tod uns scheidet?
 2009: Zwei Ärzte sind einer zu viel: Der Schatz im Silbersee
 2009: Giulias Verschwinden
 2009: Entführung in London
 2009: Schwarzwaldliebe
 2010: Rock It!
 2011: Tage die bleiben
 2011: Holger sacht nix
 2011: Mord in bester Familie
 2012: Der Landarzt
 2012: Der letzte Bulle (television series, one part)
 2012: Der Cop und der Snob (television series, one part)
 2012: Inga Lindström – Die Sache mit der Liebe
 2013: Der fast perfekte Mann
 2014: Pettson & Findus: Fun Stuff
 2014: Die Mamba
 2014: Für immer ein Mörder – Der Fall Ritter (television movie)
 2014: Blütenträume
 2015: Schuld nach Ferdinand von Schirach (television series part Volksfest)
 2016:  (cinema movie)
 2016: Tatort: Durchgedreht
 2017: SOKO Kitzbühel (television series, part Sport ist Mord)
 2017: Ein Lächeln nachts um vier
 2018: Ein starkes Team: Tödlicher Seitensprung
 2018: Morden im Norden (television series, part Liebesblind)
 2018–2019: Daheim in den Bergen (television series)
 2018: Liebesleid
 2018: Schwesternliebe
 2019: Liebesreigen
 2019: Schuld und Vergebung
 2019: Der Alte (television series, episode "Das perfekte Opfer")
 2019: Zimmer mit Stall – Berge versetzen (television movie)
 2019: Inga Lindström – Familienfest in Sommerby
 2019: Die Toten von Salzburg – Wolf im Schafspelz
 2020: Die Heiland – Wir sind Anwalt (television series, part Der Mann im Wald)

Awards 

 1998: Auslands-Studenten-Oscar
 2009: Rose d'Or (nominated). Category: Drama
 2009: Publikumspreis at the Film Festival Locarno Piazza Grande
 2010: Prix Walo (nominated)

References

External links 

 Max Herbrechter on IMDb
 Max Herbrechter on filmportal.de
 Max Herbrechter on Agentur Carola Studlar
 Max Berbrechter on www.vollfilm.de

Living people
1958 births
Actors from North Rhine-Westphalia